The Cowell-Stepney Baronetcy, of Llanelli in the County of Carmarthen, was a title in the Baronetage of the United Kingdom. It was created on 22 September 1871 for John Cowell-Stepney, Member of Parliament for Carmarthen. Born John Cowell, he was the son of Andrew Cowell and Maria Justina Stepney, sister of Sir John Stepney, 8th Baronet, of Prendergast (see Stepney baronets), and assumed the additional surname of Stepney on succeeding to the Stepney estates. The second Baronet also represented Carmarthen in Parliament. The title became extinct on his death in 1909.

Cowell-Stepney baronets, of Llanelly (1871)
Sir John Stepney Cowell-Stepney, 1st Baronet (1791–1877)
William Frederick Ross Cowell Stepney (1821–1872)
Sir (Emile Algernon) Arthur Keppell Cowell-Stepney, 2nd Baronet (1834–1909), died without heir.

See also
Stepney baronets
Stepney family
Lady Howard-Stepney

References

Extinct baronetcies in the Baronetage of the United Kingdom
Stepney family